Alexander "Sandor" Asboth (Hungarian: Asbóth Sándor, December 18, 1811 – January 21, 1868) was a Hungarian military leader best known for his victories as a Union general during the American Civil War. He also served as United States Ambassador to Argentina and as United States Ambassador to Uruguay.

Early life

Asboth was born in Keszthely, Hungary.  When Asboth was 8, his family moved to Zombor (now Sombor in Serbia). Asboth wanted to be a soldier, like his elder brother Lajos, but instead his parents decided he should be an engineer. He studied at the Mining Academy of Selmecbánya and the Institutum Geometricum in Pest.

After graduation he worked on the construction of the Széchenyi Chain Bridge as a civilian engineer and later he had some part in the river regulation of the Lower-Danube. He joined with freedom-fighter Lajos Kossuth in the 1848 revolutionary movement. In December 1848 he was promoted to captain. During his time as captain, he took part in the battles of Kápolna and Nagysalló. On the spring of 1849 he was promoted to the rank of major, then he became an adjutant of Kossuth and achieved the rank of lieutenant colonel. Asboth traveled with Kossuth to the Ottoman Empire and then to the United States in 1851, after the revolution failed.

United States and Civil War
Asboth remained in the United States and joined the Union Army. Starting in July 1861, he served as chief of staff for General John C. Frémont. Asboth was nominated brigadier general by President Abraham Lincoln on December 26, 1861, and the U.S. Senate confirmed the promotion on March 24, 1862, as the President did not formally make the appointment until March 22, 1862. Asboth was assigned command of the 4th Division in Frémont's western campaign. Asboth later led a division under Samuel Curtis, and during the Arkansas campaign he occupied Bentonville and Fayetteville. He participated in the Battle of Pea Ridge, leading troops at the Little Sugar Creek position.  His right arm was fractured by a musket ball while bringing reinforcements to support Colonel Eugene A. Carr.  Reinforcements were transferred to Henry Halleck from the Army of the Southwest and during the Siege of Corinth, Asboth commanded a brigade in the Army of the Mississippi.

Asboth later commanded garrisons in Kentucky and Ohio. In August 1863, Asboth was assigned to the District of West Florida, with his headquarters at Fort Pickens. He was badly wounded in the Battle of Marianna on September 27, 1864; his left cheek-bone being broken and his left arm fractured in two places. Asboth was mustered out of the volunteer service on August 24, 1865. On January 13, 1866, President Andrew Johnson nominated Asboth for the award of the brevet grade of major general to rank from March 13, 1865, and the U.S. Senate confirmed the award on March 12, 1866.

Later life and death
In 1866, he was appointed U.S. Minister to Argentina and Uruguay. He died in Buenos Aires in 1868, likely due to his wounds received in Florida.  He was initially buried in the city's British cemetery, but was re-buried in 1923 when La Chacarita Cemetery became a park. His remains were returned to the United States in October 1990 for burial at Arlington National Cemetery.<ref>Arlington National Cemetery</ref

See also

List of American Civil War generals (Union)

Gallery

Notes

References

Cox, Dale; The Battle of Marianna, Florida, Dale Cox, (2007)
Eicher, John H., and Eicher, David J., Civil War High Commands, Stanford University Press, 2001, .
Grant, Ulysses S., Simon, John Y.; The Papers of Ulysses S. Grant: 1837-1861, Volume 1, SIU Press, (1967)
Gracza, Rezsoe, Gracza, Margaret Young; The Hungarians in America, Lerner Publications Co., (1969)  
Warner, Ezra J.; Generals in Blue: Lives of the Union Commanders, Louisiana State Univ. Press, (1964) 
Watson, Davis; The Civil War and Reconstruction in Florida, BiblioBazaar, LLC, (2009)
Welsh, Jack D.; Medical Histories of Union Generals, Kent State University Press, (2005) 
ANC Explorer

Attribution

External links

|- style="text-align: center;"

|-

1811 births
1868 deaths
People from Keszthely
Burials at Arlington National Cemetery
American people of Hungarian descent
Union Army generals
People of Florida in the American Civil War
People of Missouri in the American Civil War
19th-century American diplomats
Forty-Eighters
Ambassadors of the United States to Uruguay
Ambassadors of the United States to Argentina